Music of the Millennium III is the third and final edition in the Music of the Millennium album series. The album was released at the beginning of the third millennium and it includes some of the most influential names that have contributed to popular music in the 20th century. The album sees some of the biggest international hits from the 1960s, 1970s, 1980s and 1990s. Different versions of the album have been released including an international versions and a Japanese version. The international version was releases with two different designs on the front- and the back of the album cover.

International track listing

Disc 1
Queen - Crazy Little Thing Called Love 
U2 - Beautiful Day  
Dire Straits - Sultans of Swing  
Jimi Hendrix - Fire 
Eric Clapton - Cocaine  
Bob Dylan - Like a Rolling Stone  
Bryan Ferry - Let's Stick Together  
Iggy Pop - Lust for Life  
INXS - New Sensation  
Meat Loaf - Bat Out of Hell  
Robbie Williams - "Rock DJ"  
Tears for Fears - Sowing the Seeds of Love  
Pet Shop Boys - It's a Sin 
Duran Duran - Save a Prayer
The Pretenders - Brass in Pocket  
Eurythmics - Sweet Dreams (Are Made of This)  
Peter Gabriel featuring Kate Bush - Don't Give Up  
Sade - Smooth Operator

Disc 2
John Lennon - Instant Karma! (We All Shine On)  
Pink Floyd - Money  
David Bowie - "Ashes to Ashes"
The Police - Walking on the Moon  
Blondie - The Tide Is High  
Madonna - Nothing Really Matters  
Joe Jackson - Steppin' Out  
Billy Joel - Uptown Girl  
Supertramp - Dreamer  
The Mamas & the Papas - California Dreamin'  
Lynyrd Skynyrd - Freebird  
Crowded House - Weather With You  
Sheryl Crow - Everyday Is a Winding Road  
Carly Simon - You're So Vain  
Elton John - Your Song  
James Brown - It's a Man's Man's Man's World  
Talking Heads - Psychokiller (live) 
The Verve - The Drugs Don't Work  
Radiohead - No Surprises

Japanese Track List

Disc 1
Queen - We Will Rock You 
Lenny Kravitz - Rock and Roll Is Dead 
Sheryl Crow - Everyday Is a Winding Road 
Eric Clapton - Wonderful Tonight  
Duran Duran - The Reflex 
Deep Purple - Black Night 
Huey Lewis and the News - I Want a New Drug  
Jimi Hendrix - Fire 
Hall & Oates - Maneater 
INXS - New Sensation 
U2 - Beautiful Day 
Rod Stewart - Some Guys Have All The Luck 
Three Dog Night - Joy to the World 
Roy Orbison - Oh, Pretty Woman 
Pink Floyd - Money 
Kim Carnes - Bette Davis Eyes 
Radiohead - No Surprises 
Bryan Ferry - Don't Stop The Dance 
The Police - Walking on the Moon 
Steve Perry - Oh Sherrie

Disc 2
John Lennon - Whatever Gets You Thru the Night 
Billy Joel - Tell Her About It 
Madonna - Nothing Really Matters 
Olivia Newton-John - Physical 
David Bowie - "Ashes to Ashes"
Eurythmics - Sweet Dreams (Are Made of This) 
Pet Shop Boys - It's A Sin 
Diana Ross & The Supremes - Baby Love 
Marvin Gaye - I Heard It Through the Grapevine  
Captain & Tennille - Love Will Keep Us Together 
Elton John - Your Song 
ABBA - Mamma Mia 
Sheena Easton - Morning Train (Nine To Five) 
Mr. Mister - Broken Wings
Robbie Nevil - C'est La Vie 
Joe Jackson - Steppin' Out 
Lionel Richie - All Night Long 
Tears for Fears - Shout 
Wham! - Careless Whisper

References

 Music of the Millennium III - International Track List
 Music of the Millennium III - International front- and backcover (one version of the album cover designs)
 Music of the Millennium III - International front- and backcover (another version of the album cover designs)
 Music of the Millennium III - Japanese Track List

2002 compilation albums